Lagadapati Madhusudhan Rao is an Indian businessman and the Executive Chairman of Lanco Infratech, and the brother of Lagadapati Rajagopal. Forbes listed him as the 29th richest Indian with a net worth of $2.3 billion in 2009, but now he is a bank defaulter According to Forbes magazine, he stands at No. 29 among the richest persons in India. According to The Indian wire he is the richest person in Hyderabad.

References

1966 births
Living people
Telugu people
People from Guntur
Wayne State University alumni
Indian billionaires
Indian engineers
Indian chief executives
Indian business executives
Businesspeople from Andhra Pradesh